Avenger of the Seven Seas, also known as The Executioner of the Seas, is a 1962 Italian epic adventure film  directed  by Domenico Paolella and starring Richard Harrison and Michèle Mercier.

Cast

Richard Harrison as David Robinson
Michèle Mercier as Jennifer
Roldano Lupi as Redway
Marisa Belli as Nike
Walter Barnes as  Van Artz
Paul Muller as Hornblut
Carlo Hintermann as Errol Robinson

Production
Avenger of the Seven Seas was co-production between Italy's Documento Film and France's Le Louvre Film.

Release
Avenger of the Seven Seas was released on 22 March 1962.

See also
 List of Italian films of 1962
 List of French films of 1962

References

Footnotes

Sources

External links

1962 adventure films
1962 films
Italian adventure films
French adventure films
Films directed by Domenico Paolella
Films set in the 18th century
Films with screenplays by Ernesto Gastaldi
1960s Italian films
1960s French films